Stefan Konstanty Myszkiewicz-Niesiołowski (born 4 February 1944) is a Polish politician and member of the Union of European Democrats.
In 1970, Niesiołowski became involved in anti-communist opposition Ruch. He was the main proponent of burning down the Lenin Museum in Poronin, for which he was sentenced to 7 years imprisonment in 1971, and was released under amnesty in 1974. In 1980, Niesiołowski joined the Independent Self-governing Trade Union "Solidarity". During the martial law, Niesiołowski was imprisoned in Jaworze for around a year.

External links
Stefan Niesiołowski - parliamentary page - includes declarations of interest, voting record, and transcripts of speeches.

1944 births
Members of the Polish Sejm 1991–1993
Members of the Polish Sejm 1997–2001
Members of the Senate of Poland 2005–2007
Polish Roman Catholics
Civic Platform politicians
Living people
Polish entomologists
Deputy Marshals of the Sejm of the Third Polish Republic
Members of the Polish Sejm 2007–2011
Members of the Polish Sejm 2011–2015
Members of the Polish Sejm 2015–2019
Academic staff of the University of Łódź
University of Łódź alumni
Solidarity (Polish trade union) activists
Knights of the Order of Polonia Restituta
Solidarity Electoral Action politicians
Christian National Union politicians